The Albatross class is a class of patrol boats in the Portuguese Navy and in the Naval Component of the Timor Leste Defence Force (FDTL). These vessels were built in 1974 and 1975 at the Alfeite Arsenal, Lisbon.

In the Portuguese Navy, the Albatross-class boats are being replaced by Argos and Centauro classes. In 2002, the NRP Albatroz and NRP Açor were transferred to the FDTL, becoming the first craft in its Naval Component. In Timor Leste, they are referred as ''Oecusse'' class.

Units

Portuguese Navy

Macau Maritime and Fiscal Police

Naval Component of Timor Leste

References 

Patrol boat classes
Patrol vessels of the Portuguese Navy
Military of East Timor
Ships built in Portugal